Marcelino Pons López (September 23, 1943 – November 29, 2001) was a Cuban professional baseball player. He also played for the Milwaukee Brewers and the Cleveland Indians.

Early years
López signed as an amateur free agent with the Philadelphia Phillies at just sixteen years old. He made his major league debut in 1963, but after just four appearances, was back in the minors by the end of April. He spent all of the 1964 season with Philadelphia's Triple-A affiliate, the Chattanooga Lookouts. After the Phillies acquired first baseman Vic Power from the Los Angeles Angels (September 9, 1964), López was selected as the “player to be named later,” the following month.

California Angels
In 1965, López went 14–13 with a 2.93 earned run average and 122 strikeouts for the Angels to finish second to Curt Blefary in American League rookie of the year balloting.

His numbers fell off considerably in 1966, largely because he led AL starters in hit batsmen with nine, and was second in the league with twelve wild pitches (the Chicago White Sox's Joe Horlen had 14). Shoulder injuries limited López to just nine innings for the Angels in 1967. On June 15, he and minor leaguer Tom Arruda were sent to the Baltimore Orioles for Woodie Held.

Baltimore Orioles
López spent all of 1968 in the minors before making his first major league appearance with the Orioles in 1969. At this point in his career, he was converted into a reliever, and was 4–2 with a 4.06 ERA out of the bullpen (he was 1–1 with a 5.40 ERA in his four starts).

The Orioles ran away with the American League East by nineteen games over the Detroit Tigers. López's only appearance in the 1969 American League Championship Series came in game one. In the twelfth inning, he faced four batters, retiring only one before manager Earl Weaver removed him in favor of Dick Hall. He did not make an appearance in the 1969 World Series against the New York Mets.

López became one of the most reliable relievers in Baltimore's bullpen in 1970, as he had a 1.65 ERA in relief. He was 1–0 with a 3.18 ERA as a starter. Baltimore returned to the post-season, and again, López made just one appearance. In the second game of the 1970 World Series, he faced just one batter, Bobby Tolan, and got him to fly out to Brooks Robinson in foul territory.

Milwaukee Brewers
During spring training the following season, López was traded to the Milwaukee Brewers for Roric Harrison and minor leaguer Marion Jackson. He began the 1971 season as a reliever, but was added to the starting rotation midway through the season. He had a 1–5 record as a starter.

Retirement
López's contract was purchased by the Cleveland Indians during spring training 1972. After spending the entire season with Cleveland's Triple-A affiliate, the Portland Beavers, López made four appearances with the Indians that September. He played minor league ball for the San Diego Padres, Pittsburgh Pirates and Houston Astros before retiring. He died in 2001 at age 58.

References

External links

Marcelino López at SABR (Baseball BioProject)
Marcelino López at Baseball Almanac
Marcelino López at Pura Pelota (Venezuelan Professional Baseball League)

1943 births
2001 deaths
Baseball players from Havana
Rojos del Águila de Veracruz players
Alijadores de Tampico players
Arkansas Travelers players
Baltimore Orioles players
Buffalo Bisons (minor league) players
California Angels players
Charleston Charlies players
Chattanooga Lookouts players
Cleveland Indians players
Columbus Astros players
Elmira Pioneers players
Florida Instructional League Orioles players
Hawaii Islanders players
Los Angeles Angels players
Major League Baseball pitchers
Major League Baseball players from Cuba
Cuban expatriate baseball players in the United States
Miami Marlins (FSL) players
Milwaukee Brewers players
Mineros de Coahuila players
Philadelphia Phillies players
Portland Beavers players
Rochester Red Wings players
Tampa Tarpons (1957–1987) players
Tiburones de La Guaira players
Cuban expatriate baseball players in Venezuela
Tigres de Aragua players
Williamsport Grays players